Kolaras Assembly constituency is one of the 230 Vidhan Sabha (Legislative Assembly) constituencies of Madhya Pradesh state in central India. This constituency came into existence in 1951, as Shivpuri Kolaras, one of the 79 Vidhan Sabha constituencies of the erstwhile Madhya Bharat state. This constituency was reserved for the candidates belonging to the Scheduled castes from 1976 to 2008.

Overview
Kolaras (constituency number 27) is one of the 5 Vidhan Sabha constituencies located in Shivpuri district. This constituency covers the entire Kolaras tehsil of the district.

Kolaras is part of Guna Lok Sabha constituency along with seven other Vidhan Sabha segments, namely, Pichhore and Shivpuri in this district, Bamori and Guna in Guna district and Ashok Nagar, Chanderi and Mungaoli in Ashoknagar district.

Members of Legislative Assembly

Shivpuri Kolaras constituency of Madhya Bharat
 1951: Tula Ram, Indian National Congress / Narhari Prashad, Indian National Congress

As a constituency of Madhya Pradesh
 1957: Vedehi Charan, Indian National Congress
 1962: Manorama, Indian National Congress
 1967: Jagadish Prasad Verma, Swatantra Party
 1972: Jagadish Prasad Verma, Bharatiya Jana Sangh
 1977: Kamta Prasad, Janata Party
 1980: Pooran Singh Bedia, Indian National Congress (I)
 1985: Pooran Singh Bedia, Indian National Congress
 1990: Om Prakash Khatik, Bharatiya Janata Party
 1993: Om Prakash Khatik, Bharatiya Janata Party
 1998: Pooran Singh Bedia, Indian National Congress
 2003: Om Prakash Khatik, Bharatiya Janata Party
 2008: Devendra Kumar Jain, Bharatiya Janata Party
 2013: Ram Singh Yadav, Indian National Congress
2018 (bypoll): Mahendra Singh Yadav

See also
 Kolaras

References

Shivpuri district
Assembly constituencies of Madhya Pradesh